The World Is Saved is a studio album by Swedish singer-songwriter Stina Nordenstam. It was released on V2 Records in 2004.

Track listing

Personnel
Credits adapted from liner notes.

 Stina Nordenstam – vocals, guitar, keyboards, arrangement, production
 Magnus Carlson – vocals (3, 6)
 Goran Kajfés – trumpet
 Björn Erikson – French horn
 Per Johansson a.k.a. Texas – saxophone, clarinet
 Per Johansson a.k.a. Ruskträsk – flute
 Jakob Ruthberg – violin, viola
 Isabel Blommé – cello
 Jesper Nordenström – piano, organ
 Mattias Torell – guitar, mandolin, bass guitar
 Johan Berthling – bass guitar, double bass
 Magnus Örström – drums
 Jonas Sjöblom – vibraphone, drums, percussion
 John Erickson – vibraphone, marimba, funeral drum
 Jonas Nyström – string arrangement
 David Österberg – programming, recording, engineering
 Tchad Blake – mixing
 Adam Ayan – mastering
 Jonas Linell – photography

Charts

References

External links
 

2004 albums
Stina Nordenstam albums
V2 Records albums